Daniel Ramírez Romero (born 21 May 1995), known professionally as Danny Romero, is a Spanish singer, songwriter, and producer. Born in Las Palmas de Gran Canaria, Canary Islands, Spain. A year later, he had his first top 20 hit single "". His first album 11:11 was released in 2018.

Romero's musical style has been described as always with Latin dance music as a reference, but it is different and unpredictable, ranging from Latin house to urban sounds, such as reggaeton and hip hop.

Career 
At the age of 10, a serious traffic accident forced Romero to spend almost 10 months of immobilisation at home, at which point he discovered the music production of his older brother's group. With him Romero began to experiment, to create his own music in his free time.

A year later, he created "Agáchate", which was an immediate hit and has generated more than 30 million views on YouTube, swept clubs and sale lists in South America, reaching  in Venezuela. Since then he is one of the most-requested producers and DJs in Spain by artists, clubs and fans.

Discography 
Studio albums
 11:11 (2018)

Singles
 "Agáchate" (2012)
 "Ella pide más" (featuring David Cuello, 2012)
 "Rosa sin espinas" (2012)
 "Motívate" (2013)
 "Cosas locas" (2014)
 "18 años" (featuring Juan Magán, 2015)
 "Carnaval" (featuring CHK, 2015)
 "Bandida" (featuring Maluma, 2015)
 "Bandida Remix" (featuring Maluma, 2015)
 "Punto final" (featuring Saga & Sonyc, 2015)
 "La oportunidad" (featuring Carlitos Rossy, 2016)
 "No creo en el amor" (featuring Sanco, 2016)
 "No creo en el amor" (featuring Sanco & Becky G, 2017)
 "Mil horas" (2017)
 "Tango" (featuring Cruz Cafuné, 2018)
 "Kamasutra" (featuring Jowell & Randy, 2018)
 "Raro" (featuring Kapla y Miky, 2018)
 "De tranquilote" (featuring Lérica, 2019)
 "Falling" (featuring CBank1k & Tk Kravitz, 2019)
 "El Hipo" (featuring Juan Magán, 2020)
 "Se Me Va" (featuring , 2021)
 "La Baba" (2021)

As featured artist
 "I Feel Alone" / David Cuello featuring Danny Romero (2011)
 "Soltera" / José de Rico featuring Danny Romero & Fito Blanko (2014)
 "Como Yo" / Xuso Jones featuring Danny Romero (2018)

References

External links
  
 

1995 births
Living people
Singers from the Canary Islands
Spanish DJs
Spanish pop singers
Spanish pop musicians
Spanish dance musicians
Spanish house musicians
Spanish hip hop musicians
Spanish electronic musicians
Spanish male singer-songwriters
Spanish singer-songwriters
Urbano musicians
Latin pop singers
Latin music songwriters
Sony Music Spain artists
21st-century Spanish singers
People from Las Palmas
21st-century Spanish male singers